Horridovalva tenuiella is a moth of the family Gelechiidae. It was described by Sattler in 1967. It is found in Algeria.

References

Moths described in 1967
Anomologinae